Garmidar may refer to:
 Garmidar, Kurdistan
 Garmidar, South Khorasan